Bar Sawma was Patriarch of the Church of the East from 1134 to 1136.

Sources 

Bar Sawma's patriarchate 
The following account of Bar Sawma's patriarchate is given by Bar Hebraeus (who erroneously placed him after the patriarch Makkikha I instead of Eliya II):

Bar Sawma was consecrated catholicus of the Nestorians on Sunday, 4 ab [August] in the year 528 of the Arabs [AD 1134] in succession to Makkikha bar Shlemun.  This Bar Sawma lived a life of bitterness, on account of the heavy burdens that were laid upon him, and was constantly praying for a quick and early death.  His prayers were answered, for after fulfilling his office for only one year and five months, he died on the eleventh day of the former kanun [December] in the year 533 of the Arabs [AD 1136].

See also
 List of patriarchs of the Church of the East

Notes

References
 Abbeloos, J. B., and Lamy, T. J., Bar Hebraeus, Chronicon Ecclesiasticum (3 vols, Paris, 1877)
 Assemani, J. A., De Catholicis seu Patriarchis Chaldaeorum et Nestorianorum (Rome, 1775)
 Brooks, E. W., Eliae Metropolitae Nisibeni Opus Chronologicum (Rome, 1910)
 Gismondi, H., Maris, Amri, et Salibae: De Patriarchis Nestorianorum Commentaria I: Amri et Salibae Textus (Rome, 1896)
 Gismondi, H., Maris, Amri, et Salibae: De Patriarchis Nestorianorum Commentaria II: Maris textus arabicus et versio Latina (Rome, 1899)

Patriarchs of the Church of the East
12th-century bishops of the Church of the East
Nestorians in the Abbasid Caliphate
1136 deaths